Wolverhampton Wanderers Under-23s (or the Development squad) is a football team that competes in Division 2 of the newly created Premier League 2. The club qualify as an entrant in the competition, by virtue of their academy holding Category 1 status. Although the league is designed for players aged 23 and below, three overage players may also feature.

The team is currently under the management of Jamie Collins and home games are primarily staged at Kidderminster Harriers' Aggborough home, though the team also plays games at Molineux. The team has been a pathway into Wolves' first team for the past two seasons, with the likes of current first-team players Hugo Bueno, Chem Campbell, Luke Cundle, Joe Hodge, Max Kilman and Dexter Lembikisa progressing from the U21 side.

Development Squad and U23s 
Players in italics have featured in a first-team match day squad during the 2020-21 season.

Out on loan

Academy and Under 18s

Wolverhampton Wanderers Academy is a Category 1 status facility and has produced several high-profile graduates including internationals Robbie Keane and Joleon Lescott. Many other players have gone on to play first team football at Molineux, including current first-team players Hugo Bueno, Chem Campbell, Luke Cundle and Dexter Lembikisa.

The current U18 lead coach is James McPike and is based at the club's Sir Jack Hayward Training Ground.

All players are correct in accordance to the Wolves Official Website (not including trialists)

Michael Bristow Trophy / Academy Scholar of the Year 
The Michael Bristow trophy is named after Mike Bristow, a lifelong Wolverhampton Wanderers FC supporter, who died in 2008.

The trophy was donated to Wolverhampton Wanderers FC by Keith Brown.

The trophy is a sterling silver cup, below which are engraved the names of the annual winner, which is decided upon by Wolves and awarded annually to their Academy Scholar of the Year. The trophy is retained in the trophy room at the Molineux.

The presentation is generally made on the pitch in one of the final first team home games of the season, by Keith Brown, Hazel Bristow and Matt Bristow. The winner is given an engraved trophy donated by Keith Brown or Hazel Bristow, to mark their achievement.

References

Wolverhampton Wanderers F.C.
Football academies in England
Premier League International Cup